The knockout phase of the 2009–10 UEFA Europa League began on 18 February, and concluded with the final at the Volksparkstadion in Hamburg, Germany on 12 May 2010. The knockout phase involved the 24 teams that finished in the top two in each group in the group stage and the eight teams that finished in third place in the UEFA Champions League group stage.

Each tie in the knockout phase, apart from the final, was played over two legs, with each team playing one leg at home. The team that had the higher aggregate score over the two legs progressed to the next round. In the event that aggregate scores finished level, the team that scored more goals away from home over the two legs progressed. If away goals were also equal, 30 minutes of extra time were played. If goals were scored during extra time and the aggregate score was still level, the visiting team qualified by virtue of more away goals scored. If no goals were scored during extra time, there would be a penalty shootout after extra time.

In the final, the tie was played over just one leg at a neutral venue. If scores were level at the end of normal time in the final, extra time would be played, followed by penalties if scores remained tied.

All times CET/CEST

Qualified teams

Teams advancing from group stage

Teams relegated from Champions League group stage

Bracket

Round of 32
The draw for the Round of 32 took place on 18 December 2009, and featured the top two teams from each group in the group stage and the eight third-place finishers from the UEFA Champions League group stage.

The first legs of the first knockout round were played on 18 February 2010, while the second legs were played on 25 February.

|}

First leg

Second leg

Benfica won 5–1 on aggregate.

Anderlecht won 5–1 on aggregate.

Marseille won 6–2 on aggregate.

Panathinaikos won 6–4 on aggregate.

Atlético Madrid won 3–2 on aggregate.

Fulham won 3–2 on aggregate.

Liverpool won 4–1 on aggregate.

3–3 on aggregate; Hamburg won on away goals.

Wolfsburg won 6–3 on aggregate.

Standard Liège won 3–2 on aggregate.

Werder Bremen won 4–2 on aggregate.

Lille won 3–2 on aggregate.

Sporting CP won 4–2 on aggregate.

Juventus won 2–1 on aggregate.

Valencia won 3–1 on aggregate.

Rubin Kazan won 3–0 on aggregate.

Notes
Note 1: Unirea Urziceni played their only knockout phase match at Stadionul Steaua in Bucharest as their Stadionul Tineretului did not meet UEFA criteria.

Round of 16
The draw for the Round of 16 took place on 18 December 2009, after the Round of 32 draw.

|}

First leg

Second leg

Fulham won 5–4 on aggregate.

5–5 on aggregate; Valencia won on away goals.

Benfica won 3–2 on aggregate.

Standard Liège won 4–1 on aggregate.

Liverpool won 3–1 on aggregate.

2–2 on aggregate; Atlético Madrid won on away goals.

Hamburg won 6–5 on aggregate.

Wolfsburg won 3–2 on aggregate.

Quarter-finals
The eight winners from the first knockout round were drawn into four pairs of home-and-away matches. The first legs were played on 1 April 2010, and the second legs were played on 8 April 2010. The draw is made regardless of association or previous group status.

|}

First leg

Second leg

Fulham won 3–1 on aggregate.

Hamburg won 5–2 on aggregate.

2–2 on aggregate; Atlético Madrid won on away goals.

Liverpool won 5–3 on aggregate.

Semi-finals
The four quarter-final winners were drawn into two pairs of home-and-away matches. The first legs were played on 22 April 2010, with the second legs on 29 April 2010.

|}

First leg

Second leg

Fulham won 2–1 on aggregate.

2–2 on aggregate; Atlético Madrid won on away goals.

Final

The final took place on 12 May 2010 at the Volksparkstadion in Hamburg, Germany.

References

External links
2009–10 UEFA Europa League, UEFA.com

Knockout phase
UEFA Europa League knockout phases